Catecholaminergic means "related to catecholamines". The catecholamine neurotransmitters include dopamine, epinephrine (adrenaline), and norepinephrine (noradrenaline).

A catecholaminergic agent (or drug) is a chemical which functions to directly modulate the catecholamine systems in the body or brain. Examples include adrenergics and dopaminergics.

See also
 Adenosinergic
 Cannabinoidergic
 Cholinergic
 GABAergic
 Glutamatergic
 Glycinergic
 Histaminergic
 Monoaminergic
 Opioidergic

References

Neurochemistry
Neurotransmitters